Old Brick Store, also known as the Old Brick Hotel and The Granary, is a historic commercial building located near Smyrna, New Castle County, Delaware.  It was built about 1764, and is a two- to three-story, three bay brick building.  The building marks the location of
what may have been a grain shipping center for southern New Castle County.

It was listed on the National Register of Historic Places in 1973.

References

External links

Historic American Buildings Survey in Delaware
Commercial buildings on the National Register of Historic Places in Delaware
Commercial buildings completed in 1764
Buildings and structures in New Castle County, Delaware
1764 establishments in Delaware
National Register of Historic Places in New Castle County, Delaware